Blanding is a small unincorporated community and railroad junction in Jo Daviess County, Illinois, United States, north of Savanna Army Depot.

References

External links
 Images of trains near Blanding on Flickr
 Bulletin of the United States Geological Survey, Volume 440, Page 233
 Blanding on Google Maps

Unincorporated communities in Illinois
Unincorporated communities in Jo Daviess County, Illinois